Fibrous capsule may refer to:
 Fibrous capsule of Glisson
 Fibrous membrane of articular capsule